is a 1980 Japanese war film directed by Toshio Masuda. The Japanese title "Ni hyaku san kochi" means 203 Hill. The film depicts the fiercest battles at 203 Hill in the Siege of Port Arthur during the Russo-Japanese War 1904 - 1905.

Cast
 Tatsuya Nakadai as Nogi Maresuke
 Tetsuro Tamba as Kodama Gentarō
 Teruhiko Aoi as Koga Takeshi
 Kenji Niinuma as Kinoshita
 Toshiyuki Nagashima as Nogi Yasusuke
 Makoto Satō as Ushiwaka Toratarō
 Isao Tamagawa as Matsumura Kanetomo
 Hiroshi Nawa as Nakamura Satoru
 Yoko Nogiwa as Nogi Sizuko
 Masako Natsume as Matsuo Sachi
 Shigeru Kōyama as Yamagata Aritomo
 Shigeru Amachi as Kaneko Kentarō
 Nobuo Kawai as Komura Jutarō
 Yoshio Inaba as Ijichi Kōsuke
 Jirō Yabuki as Kuji
 Kastutoshi Arata as Ainoda
 Kunio Murai as Oki Teisuke
 Akihiko Hirata as Nagaoka Gaishi
 Go Wakabayashi as Kamiizumi Tokuya
 Kayo Matsuo as Empress Shōken
 Hisaya Morishige as Itō Hirobumi
 Toshirō Mifune as Emperor Meiji

Staff 
 Planning: Kiyoshi Koda, Kanji Amao, Hiroko Ota, Tsuneo Seto
 Screenplay: Kazuo Kasahara
 Photography: Masahiko Iimura
 Special Effects Director: Akinori Nakano
 Sound Recordist: Hiroyoshi Sokata
 Lighting: Shigeru Umeya
 Production Designer: Hiroshi Kitagawa
 Chief Assistant Director: Akinori Baba
 Editor: Kiyoaki Saito
 Sound Effects: Ryuzo Iwafuji
 Record: Shigeko Katsuhara
 Mito: Shinosuke Ogata
 Device: Shigeharu Yasawa
 Decoration: Yasuji Igarashi
 Special Effects: Ohira SFX 
 Acting office: Mitsuo Yamada
 Cosmetics: Mamoru Inoue, Kinue Suetake
 Beauty: Takako Miyajima
 Costume: Fukusaki Seigo
 Tattoo: Ryoji Kasumi
 Advertiser: Shun Sakamoto, Hachio Yamamoto
 Stills Photography: Mitsuo Kato
 Russian Language Instructor: Mariko Nabeya
 Dialect guidance: Kazuya Takeo, Kenji Isomura

SFX Unit 
Photography: Takao Tsurumi
Lighting: Masakuni Morimoto
Art Director: Yasuyuki Inoue
Optical Photography: Takeshi Miyanishi
Animation Produced by: Toei Animation
Film Processing: Toei Labotech 
Chief of Operations: Michio Ishikawa

Music Recording Staff 
Directed and Conducted by: Naozumi Yamamoto
Music: Akihiko Takashima
Performed by: New Japan Philharmonic Orchestra
Produced by: Free Flight Records, Oz Music
Released Thru: Warner Pioneer

Special Thanks 
Narrator: Taketoshi Naito

Planning Cooperation
 Ryuzo Sejima, Shiro Hara, Masataka Chihaya

Costume production
 Tokyo costume Cooperation
 Oshima Onsen Hotel
 Fujita Tourism Oshima Kowakien
 Oshima Town Hall
 Oshima Branch of Tokyo
 Mitsui Kinzoku Kogyo Co., Ltd.
 Book Publishing Edition
 Photo Book Russo-Japanese War
 Chuo Nogikai
 Nogi Shrine
 Group Himawari
 Toei Actor Center

Produced in Association with 
 Toho Eizo Art

Honors

Japan Academy Film Prize
Won:Best Actor in a Supporting Role - Tetsuro Tamba

23rd Blue Ribbon Awards
Won: 1981: Blue Ribbon Awards: Best Actor - Tatsuya Nakadai
Won: 1981: Blue Ribbon Awards: Best Supporting Actor - Tetsuro Tamba

References

External links

1980 films
1980s Japanese-language films
Japanese epic films
Films directed by Toshio Masuda
Japanese war films
1980s war films
Films set in the Meiji period
Films set in 1904
Films set in 1905
Toei Company films
1980s Japanese films